Ben Blood (born March 15, 1989) is an American professional ice hockey defenseman currently playing for Graz 99ers of the Austrian IceHL. He was drafted in the fourth round, 120th overall, of the 2007 NHL Entry Draft by the Ottawa Senators.

Playing career
Blood played prep hockey at Shattuck-Saint Mary's for two seasons. He helped them win USA Hockey's Tier I 18 & Under National Championship in 2007.

Collegiate
Blood played for the University of North Dakota for four seasons while majoring in recreation and tourism studies.

In his freshman season, Blood was named UND's Most Improved Player. He recorded one point that season, an assist, in a game against the Michigan Tech Huskies on March 13, 2009. His sophomore season was more productive. Blood put up 14 points in 43 games and was named to the All-WCHA Academic team and WCHA Final Five All-Tournament team.

In his junior year, Blood played in all 44 games of the season and set a new career high with 10 assists. At the conclusion of the season, he was again named to the All-WCHA Academic team.

In his senior year, Blood set a new career high with 21 points in 42 games. Blood was named an alternate captain for the Sioux at the beginning of the season, however, after an on ice altercation during a January game against Minnesota, he was stripped of his A status. Despite this, Blood was selected for the NCAA (WCHA) Third All-Star Team.

On April 4, 2012, Blood signed a two-year Entry Level Contract with the Ottawa Senators and an amateur tryout contract with the Senators American Hockey League affiliate, the Binghamton Senators so Blood could finish the season with them.

Professional
Blood began the 2012–13 season with the Binghamton Senators but after three games was reassigned to their ECHL affiliate, the Elmira Jackals. He was periodically moved between the AHL and ECHL until he agreed to terms with the Wheeling Nailers in October 2014. His agreement was short-lived, however, as on November 25, 2014, Blood left the Wheeling Nailers and joined Stjernen Hockey in the GET-ligaen league. The following season, Blood joined the Lahti Pelicans in the Liiga. While playing with the Pelicans, Blood received a two game suspension due to an altercation with Siim Liivik and a three game suspension for Cross-checking and injuring Anthony Guttig. On October 30, 2015, Blood signed a two year contract extension with the Pelicans. On April 11, 2017, Blood left the Pelicans and joined Ässät.

In July 2018, Blood joined the Cardiff Devils of the Elite Ice Hockey League. However, he soon left on November 7, 2018, to re-join the Liiga league with Tappara on a two-year contract.

In May 2021, Blood signed terms with Graz 99ers ahead of the 2021-22 Austrian Hockey League season.

Personal life
Blood's sisters, Erin and Molly, both play hockey. Molly played for the Minnesota Thoroughbreds and Erin played NCAA hockey for Boston College. His second cousin Danny Kristo was drafted by the Montreal Canadiens in the 2008 NHL Entry Draft.

Career statistics

Awards and honors

References

External links
 

1989 births
Living people
American men's ice hockey defensemen
Ässät players
Binghamton Senators players
Cardiff Devils players
Des Moines Buccaneers players
Elmira Jackals (ECHL) players
Graz 99ers players
Indiana Ice players
Lahti Pelicans players
North Dakota Fighting Hawks men's ice hockey players
People from Plymouth, Minnesota
Ice hockey players from Minnesota
Stjernen Hockey players
Tappara players
Wheeling Nailers players
American expatriate ice hockey players in Norway
American expatriate ice hockey players in Austria
American expatriate ice hockey players in Finland
American expatriate ice hockey players in Wales